Marc H. Bornstein (born in 1947) is an Affiliate with the Eunice Kennedy Shriver National Institute of Child Health and Human Development in Bethesda, International Research Fellow at the Institute for Fiscal Studies in London, and senior advisor for research for ECD Parenting Programmes at UNICEF in New York City.

Education
Bornstein holds a BA from Columbia College, Columbia University, MS/PhD degrees from Yale University, and honorary doctorates from the University of Padua and University of Trento in Italy and is Honorarprofessor of Psychology at the University of Heidelberg in Germany.

Recognition
Bornstein was a J. S. Guggenheim Foundation Fellow, and he received a Research Career Development Award from the National Institute of Child Health and Human Development.  He also received the C. S. Ford Cross-Cultural Research Award from the Human Relations Area Files, the B. R. McCandless Young Scientist Award and the Division 7 Award for Distinguished Contributions to Developmental Psychology from the American Psychological Association, a United States PHS Superior Service Award and an Award of Merit from the National Institutes of Health, two Japan Society for the Promotion of Science Fellowships, four Awards for Excellence from the American Mensa Education & Research Foundation, the Arnold Gesell Prize from the Theodor Hellbrügge Foundation, the Distinguished Scientific Contribution Award from the International Society for the Study of Behavioral Development, and both the Distinguished International Contributions to Child Development Award and the Distinguished Scientific Contributions to Child Development Award from the Society for Research in Child Development.

Bornstein is founder and director of the International Network of Parenting and Child Development (participating countries: Argentina, Belgium, Brazil, Cameroon, Canada, Chile, England, France, India, Israel, Italy, Japan, Kenya, Peru, Republic of Korea, the United States), and he has multiple associated research sites (China, Colombia, Jordan, the Philippines, Sweden, Thailand, and 54 UNICEF Multiple Indicator Cluster Survey LMICs).  He is published in Chinese, Czech, English, French, German, Hebrew, Italian, Japanese, Korean, Polish, Portuguese, Spanish, and Turkish, and he has given invited presentations and named lectureships in Argentina, Belgium, Brazil, Canada, Chile, China, Colombia, Czechoslovakia, Denmark, England, Finland, France, Germany, India, Israel, Italy, Japan, Jordan, Luxembourg, 
the Philippines, Poland, Portugal, Republic of Korea, Scotland, Singapore, Sweden, Thailand, and the United States.

Position
Bornstein is president emeritus of the Society for Research in Child Development, executive committee member of the International Society for the Study of Behavioral Development, and a past member of the Society for Research in Child Development Governing Council and executive committee of the International Congress of Infant Studies.  Bornstein has held faculty positions at Princeton University and New York University as well as academic appointments as visiting scientist at the Max-Planck-Institut für Psychiatrie in Munich; visiting fellow at University College London; Professeur Invité at the Laboratoire de Psychologie Expérimentale in the Université René Descartes in Paris; Child Clinical Fellow at the Institute for Behavior Therapy in New York; visiting professor at the University of Tokyo; Professeur Invité at the Laboratoire de Psychologie du Développement et de l'Éducation de l'Enfant in the Sorbonne in Paris; visiting fellow of the British Psychological Society; visiting scientist at the Human Development Resource Centre in Bamenda, Cameroon; principal scientist for Parenting and Child Well-being, The Center for Child Well-being, Atlanta, Georgia; visiting scholar at the Institute of Psychology in Seoul National University in Seoul, South Korea; visiting professor at the Faculty of Cognitive Science in the University of Trento, Italy; Professor Visitante at the Pontificia Universidad Católica de Chile in Santiago, Chile; Institute for Advanced Studies Benjamin Meaker Visiting Professor, University of Bristol; Jacobs Foundation Scholar-in-Residence, Marbach, Germany; honorary fellow, Department of Psychiatry, Oxford University; adjunct academic member of the council of the Department of Cognitive Sciences, University of Trento, Italy; visiting professor at the University of Maryland Baltimore County; adjunct professor in the Faculty of Graduate Studies and external member of the LaMarsh Centre for Child & Youth Research at York University in Toronto; and visiting scholar at the Eliot Pearson Department of Child Study and Human Development at Tufts University.

Bornstein is editor emeritus of Child Development and founding editor of Parenting: Science and Practice. He is series editor of Studies in Parenting and the Cambridge University Press Elements in Child Development and has served as guest editor for numerous special issues in scientific journals. He has administered both federal and foundation grants, sits on the editorial boards of several professional journals, is a member of scholarly societies in a variety of disciplines, and consults for governments, foundations, universities, publishers, scientific journals, the media, and UNICEF. He has organized numerous scientific workshops and conferences and has contributed to numerous scholarly society panels. Bornstein is also recognized as one of the originators of the signature block. Bornstein revised children's toy and safety guidelines for the U.S. Consumer Product Safety Commission.

Publications
Bornstein is coauthor of Infancy: The Basics; Parenting and Child Development in Low- and Middle-Income Countries; Parenting, Infancy, Culture: Specificity and Commonality in Argentina, Belgium, Israel, Italy, and the United States; Parenting: Selected Works of Marc H. Bornstein; The Architecture of the Child Mind: g, Fs, and the Hierarchical Model of Intelligence; Gender in Low- and Middle-Income Countries; Development in Infancy (5 editions); Development: Infancy through Adolescence; Lifespan Development; Genitorialità: Fattori Biologici E Culturali Dell'essere Genitori; and Perceiving Similarity and Comprehending Metaphor.  He is general editor of The Crosscurrents in Contemporary Psychology Series (9 volumes), the Monographs in Parenting series (7 volumes), and the Studies in Parenting series (3 volumes), and the Cambridge Elements in Child Development (12 Elements). He edited Maternal Responsiveness: Characteristics and Consequences; the Handbook of Parenting (Vols. I-V, 3 editions); and the Handbook of Cultural Developmental Science (Parts 1 & 2), and is editor-in-chief of the SAGE Encyclopedia of Lifespan Human Development. He also coedited Developmental Science: An Advanced Textbook (7 editions); Stability and Continuity in Mental Development; Contemporary Constructions of the Child; Early Child Development in the French Tradition; The Role of Play in the Development of Thought; Acculturation and Parent-Child Relationships; Immigrant Families in Contemporary Society; The Developing Infant Mind: Origins of the Social Brain; Ecological Settings and Processes in Developmental Systems (Volume 4 of the Handbook of Child Psychology and Developmental Science); Psychological Insights for Understanding COVID-19 and Families, Parents, and Children; and Parenting Across Cultures from Childhood to Adolescence: Development in Nine Countries. He is co-editor of the forthcoming APA Handbook of Pediatric Psychology, Developmental – Behavioral Pediatrics, and Developmental Science.

Bornstein has published widely in experimental, methodological, comparative, developmental, and cultural science as well as neuroscience, pediatrics, and aesthetics.  The author of hundreds of scientific papers and chapters in scholarly collections, Bornstein was named to the Top 20 Authors for Productivity in Developmental Science by the American Educational Research Association.

Bornstein is author of or consultant on several children's books, videos, and puzzles in The Child's World and Baby Explorer series.  Bornstein has administered both federal and foundation grants, sits on the editorial boards of several professional journals, is a member of scholarly societies in a variety of disciplines, and consults for governments, foundations, universities, publishers, scientific journals, the media, and UNICEF.

Personal life

Bornstein is married with two children, the physicians Lea and Jonathan Bornstein. Bornstein is a painter.

References

Living people
21st-century American biologists
20th-century American psychologists
Yale University alumni
Princeton University faculty
New York University faculty
Academic staff of the University of Paris
1947 births
Columbia College (New York) alumni
21st-century American psychologists
American textbook writers